SOUNDEDIT (International Festival of Music Producers and Sound Designers SOUNDEDIT) − an annual, international festival dedicated to music producers and sound designers. Since its beginning in 2009, the festival has been taking place in Łódź, Poland. The main award of the festival is The Man with the Golden Ear Award.

The main organizer of SOUNDEDIT is Art Industry Foundation established by Marcin Tercjak (a music journalist and Radio Łódź presenter) and Maciej Werk (a music producer and the leader of alternative music group Hedone). The chairman of the foundation and the director of the festival is Maciej Werk.

Aims of the festival 
According to the organizers, the festival is an "attempt to honor those who stand behind the tedious process of creating a song or a whole album".

The other basics aims of the festival are:
 To make Łodz a place of annual meetings of the most remarkable music producers and sound designers (...).
 Building the prestige of The Man With The Golden Ear Award so that it becomes a well-known and highly desirable award.
 Organizing exceptional concerts which will accompany meetings with music producers.
 Developing educational activity in the field of music and recording techniques.
 Creating an annual, important and valued event in Łodz, a city of rich musical traditions.

The Man with the Golden Ear Award laureates 
2009:
 Daniel Lanois
 Gareth Jones
 Grzegorz Ciechowski (posthumously)
2010:
 Adrian Sherwood
 Andrzej Smolik
 Martin Hannett (posthumously)
2011:
 Mark "Flood" Ellis
 Daniel Miller
 Adam Toczko
2012:
 Martin „Youth” Glover
 Józef B. Nowakowski
 Steve Osborne
 Eugeniusz Rudnik
 Tim Simenon
2013:
 Dan Austin
 Haydn Bendall
 Władysław Komendarek
 Bill Laswell
2014:
 Karl Bartos
 Howard Bernstein (Howie B)
 John Cale
 Lech Janerka
2015:
 Bob Geldof
 Roger Glover
 Wojciech Waglewski
 Józef Skrzek
 Leszek Biolik
2016:
 Brian Eno
 Alec Empire
 Adam Nowak
 George Martin
2017:
 Marek Biliński
 Gary Numan
 Michael Nyman
 Tony Visconti
2018:
 Andrzej Korzyński
 Giorgio Moroder
 Katarzyna Nosowska

References 

Music festivals in Poland
Events in Łódź
Music production
Music festivals established in 2009
Autumn events in Poland